Albert Park railway station may refer to:

Albert Park railway station, Adelaide, Australia
Albert Park light rail station, Melbourne, Australia
Withington and Albert Park railway station, a former station in Manchester, UK